Varig Flight 797 was a flight from Abidjan, Côte d'Ivoire to Rio de Janeiro, Brazil. On 3 January 1987, the Boeing 707-320C crashed while landing, killing all 12 crew members and 38 of the 39 passengers. After an engine failure, the pilot decided to return but misjudged the approach and stalled the aircraft. Many passengers who survived the initial crash perished in the fire that followed.

Aircraft and crew 
The aircraft involved in the accident was a Boeing 707-379C, registered as PP-VJK, which first flew in 1968. It was powered by four Pratt & Witney JT3D-3B turbofan engines. PP-VJK was Varig's final passenger Boeing 707, and the aircraft's final flight with Varig, having already been sold to the Brazilian Air Force.

The flight crew consisted of captain Júlio César Carneiro Corrêa (38), first officer Nélson Figueiredo, and flight engineer Eugênio Cardoso.

Accident 
On 2 January, during the aircraft's penultimate flight to Abidjan, the fire alarm for the outer left (No. 1) engine sounded. Another airline, Air Afrique, which performed maintenance for Varig, inspected the engine and determined that it was a false alarm. Flight engineer Cardoso reported high fuel temperatures in the engine, but the other engines were functioning normally. As a precaution, captain Corrêa shut down the faulty engine and decided to return to Abidjan.

Cardoso then reported a fuel leak on engine no 1, though the crew had difficulty identifying it. A flight attendant reported that a passenger had observed engine no. 1 emitting fire. As the aircraft flew over Abidjan, the tower controller at Port Bouet Airport cleared the flight to land on runway 03, the closest available runway. Even though the weather was suitable for a visual approach, captain Corrêa requested to land on runway 21 instead, as it was equipped with an instrument landing system (ILS). However, this approach required additional maneuvers, including a left turn onto a 270 degree heading. The crew (possibly in an attempted to prevent asymmetric thrust) decided to delay extending the flaps and the landing gear until turning past the VHF omnidirectional range. With the flaps retracted, the aircraft flew faster to prevent a stall.

During the turn, the stick shaker (stall warning) was activated and the ground proximity warning system emitted several "bank angle" warnings.

Victims 
Nationalities of the persons on board:

Three people (all passengers) initially survived, though one died several hours later. Four days after the disaster, a British passenger died of his injuries on board a Swiss aircraft while arriving in Paris; he was going to be transferred to a burn unit in a Paris suburb. The sole survivor, identified as an Ivorian university professor, had burns on less than 20 percent of his body. While being interviewed by investigators, the professor said that more people had survived the initial impact but died of burns. He also stated that he managed to drag the British passenger who initially survived, away from the wreckage of the aircraft. The sole survivor died of a heart attack on 4 March 2015 at the age of 72.

See also 

 Varig Flight 810
 VASP Flight 168

References

External links

Aircraft details at Aviation Safety Network

Aviation accidents and incidents in 1987
Aviation accidents and incidents in Ivory Coast
Accidents and incidents involving the Boeing 707
797
1987 in Ivory Coast
January 1987 events in Africa
Airliner accidents and incidents caused by mechanical failure
Airliner accidents and incidents caused by engine failure